Mississippi University for Women (MUW or "The W") is a coeducational public university in Columbus, Mississippi. It was formerly named the Industrial Institute and College for the Education of White Girls and later the Mississippi State College for Women. Men have been admitted to MUW since 1982 and today make up about 20 percent of the student body.

History 
Upon its establishment in 1884, Mississippi University for Women became the first public women's college in the United States. Then formally called the Mississippi Industrial Institute and College for the Education of White Girls (II&C), the institution was created by an act of the Mississippi Legislature on March 12, 1884, for the dual purposes of providing a liberal arts education for white women and preparing them for employment.  The II&C was located in Columbus on a campus formerly occupied by the Columbus Female Institute, a private college founded in 1847.  The II&C's first session began on October 22, 1885, with an enrollment of approximately 250 students.  Dr. Richard Watson Jones was selected by the State Institutions of Higher Learning board of trustees as the university's first president.  President Jones also taught physics and chemistry at the institute, and he was joined that first year by 17 additional faculty members.

The name of the institution changed to Mississippi State College for Women in 1920 to reflect an emphasis on collegiate, rather than vocational, education.

In 1966, three local women from Hunt High School became the first black undergraduates at MSCW. They lived off campus, as the dormitories remained segregated until 1968. At the same time, three teachers from Hunt became the first graduate students at the school. The students were known collectively as The Fabulous Six.

In 1971, Mississippi State College for Women won the intercollegiate women's basketball national championship (the third ever held).

In 1974, the name was changed to the Mississippi University for Women to reflect the expanded academic programs, including graduate studies. All other Mississippi state colleges were also designated universities at this time.

In 1982, the U.S. Supreme Court ruled in the case of Mississippi University for Women v. Hogan that the nursing school's single-sex admissions policies were in violation of the Equal Protection Clause of the Fourteenth Amendment. Following this decision, the Board of Trustees of State Institutions of Higher Learning ordered the university to change its policies to allow the admission of qualified men into all university programs. In 1988, the Board of Trustees reaffirmed the mission of MUW as an institution providing quality academic programs for all qualified students, with emphasis on distinctive opportunities for women.

In a 1997 article in Innovative Higher Education, Dale Thorn described MUW's successful attempt to avoid a merger with another institution and to remain a separate entity.

In 2009, President Dr. Claudia Limbert announced the possibility of changing the university's name to "Reneau University". The Mississippi State legislature did not approve the change.

On February 1, 2019, Nora Roberts Miller was inaugurated as the first alumna president of Mississippi University for Women. She was named the 15th president on September 15, 2018, by the State Institutions of Higher Learning board of trustees.

In March 2019, the women's basketball team won the USCAA National Championship after defeating the University of Maine at Fort Kent.

Rankings 
In 2022, U.S. News & World Report ranked The W 15th as a best value among public Southern regional universities and 18th among the top public schools. The university also lands in the top 10 on the social mobility scale.

Athletics 
The MUW athletic teams are called the Owls (formerly known as the Blues). The university is a member in the NCAA Division III ranks, primarily competing in the St. Louis Intercollegiate Athletic Conference (SLIAC) since the 2022–23 academic year. The Owls are also a member of the United States Collegiate Athletic Association (USCAA). The program competed as an NCAA D-III Independent from 2019–20 to 2021–22. Previously, the teams participated in the NCAA Division II ranks, primarily competing in the Gulf South Conference (GSC), from 1993–94 to 2002–03. At the end of that school year, the university dropped its athletics program.

MUW competes in 15 intercollegiate varsity sports: Men's sports include baseball, basketball, cross country, golf, soccer, tennis, and track & field; while women's sports include basketball, cross country, golf, soccer, softball, tennis, track & field, and volleyball.

History 
Originally a women's institution, it became a co-educational university in 1982, but men's sports were not introduced until the 2017–18 school year (when the school re-instated its athletic program and joined the USCAA) with baseball, cross country, and soccer; basketball, golf, and tennis began the following year, and track and field the year after.

The damage from a November 10, 2002, F3 tornado caused MUW to cancel athletic programs until 2017. The tornado ripped through the MUW campus, particularly on the southern half of campus. Nearly half (26 of 60) buildings on campus were damaged, some heavily; the Edna Pohl gymnasium was leveled. 

In June 2021, MUW was admitted to the SLIAC as a full member to begin play during the 2022–23 academic year. MUW became an active Division III member that year.

Accomplishments 
MUW (then known as Mississippi State College for Women) won the 1971 national championship in women's basketball, defeating West Chester State, 57-55. In the 1972 AIAW National Basketball Championship, MSCW finished fourth, losing in the semifinals to the legendary Immaculata team.

Notable alumni 
Notable MUW alumni include:

 Tina Renee Johns Benkiser, chairman of the Republican Party of Texas, 2003–2009
 Dorothy Vredenburgh Bush, secretary of the Democratic National Committee (1944–1989) and the youngest person and first woman to be elected as an officer of either the Democratic or Republican party
 Kay Beevers Cobb, Mississippi Supreme Court Justice, retired
 Bertha V. Fontaine, home economist 
 Chris Fryar, musician, drummer of Zac Brown Band
 Susan Golden, National Academy of Sciences member and Professor of Molecular Biology at University of California, San Diego
 Laverne Greene-Leech, one of three African-American students to desegregate Mississippi State College for Women (now MUW) in 1966
 Elizabeth Lee Hazen, co-discoverer of nystatin
 Valerie Jaudon, artist
 Lenore Prather, first female Mississippi Supreme Court Justice
 Toni Seawright, first African-American Miss Mississippi (1987) and 4th runner-up to Miss America that same year
 Doris Taylor, scientist known for achievements in stem cell research
 Eudora Welty, Pulitzer Prize-winning author
 Elizabeth H. West, librarian, first woman to head the Texas State Library, first librarian of Texas Tech University, co-founder and first President of the Southwestern Library Association
 Blanche Colton Williams, author and first editor of the O. Henry Prize Stories
 Linkie Marais, television chef and finalist from Food Network Star Season 8

See also 

 List of current and historical women's universities and colleges in the United States
 Timeline of women's colleges in the United States
 Mississippi School for Mathematics and Science
 Women's colleges in the United States
 AIAW Champions

References

External links 
 Official website
 Official athletics website

 
Columbus, Mississippi
Public universities and colleges in Mississippi
Former women's universities and colleges in the United States
Educational institutions established in 1884
Universities and colleges accredited by the Southern Association of Colleges and Schools
Education in Lowndes County, Mississippi
Buildings and structures in Lowndes County, Mississippi
1884 establishments in Mississippi